The First Baptist Church (or "Brattle Square Church") is an historic American Baptist Churches USA congregation, established in 1665.  It is one of the oldest Baptist churches in the United States. It first met secretly in members homes, and the doors of the first church were nailed shut by a decree from the Puritans in March 1680. The church was forced to move to Noddle's Island. The church was forced to be disguised as a tavern and members traveled by water to worship. Rev. Dr. Stillman led the church in the North End for over 40 years, from 1764 to 1807.  The church moved to Beacon Hill in 1854, where it was the tallest steeple in the city. After a slow demise under Rev. Dr. Rollin Heber Neale, the church briefly joined with the Shawmut Ave. Church, and the Warren Avenue Tabernacle, and merged and bought the current church in 1881, for $100,000.00. Since 1882 it has been located at the corner of Commonwealth Avenue and Clarendon Street in the Back Bay. The interior is currently a pending Boston Landmark through the Boston Landmarks Commission.

History

1665–1837
The congregation was founded in 1665 despite a Massachusetts law prohibiting opposition to infant baptism. Many of the early members of the church were persecuted  and imprisoned by the state church for heresy, including the first pastor, Thomas Gould. Shortly before the founding of the church, the first Harvard College president, Henry Dunster, was forced to resign his position for refusing to baptize his infant. Dunster had been theologically influenced by Dr. John Clarke and other Rhode Island Baptists persecuted in Massachusetts. During King Philip's War, John Myles pastored the church while on hiatus from the First Baptist Church in Swansea, which was the first church in the state. "In 1679, the Boston Baptists built a meetinghouse in the North End of Boston, at the corner of Salem and Stillman Streets. ...In the early 1700s, the small building was replaced by a larger wooden one on the same site. Here the Church flourished, for 43 years (1764–1807) under the leadership of Samuel Stillman." Samuel Stillman kept the doors open for services while the British invaded Boston and is said to have preached against them every single service.

In 1682, under the watch of William Screven, the church organised a spinoff mission in present-day Kittery, Maine;  as a result of issues with Congregationalism in the 1690s, the church moved to Charleston, South Carolina and is the modern day First Baptist Church meeting in James Island, South Carolina.

1837–1882
In 1837 the First Baptist congregation moved into a new brick church building (fourth meeting house) on the corner of Hanover Street and Union Street. Preachers included Rollin Heber Neale. The congregation remained at this location until 1882.

1882–present

The current church building (fifth meeting house) was designed by the notable architect Henry Hobson Richardson and built in 1869–71. It opened in 1872 to serve the Unitarian congregation of the Brattle Street Church, also known as the Church in Brattle Square, which had been demolished in 1872. The Unitarian congregation dissolved soon after moving to this building. The First Baptist congregation bought the building in 1881 for a sum of $100,000/00. The historic and prominent tower with distinctive friezes carved "in-situ" by Frédéric Auguste Bartholdi (sculptor of the Statue of Liberty) representing four sacraments, with faces of famous Bostonians (including Longfellow and Hawthorne), Abraham Lincoln, and Bartholdi's friends of that era, (including Garibaldi). This building was Richardson's first church in Boston before he designed his masterpiece, Trinity Church. This church was added to the National Register of Historic Places in 1972. The congregation is affiliated with the American Baptist Churches USA.

See also
National Register of Historic Places listings in northern Boston, Massachusetts

References

Further reading
 Rollin Heber Neale. An address delivered on the two hundredth anniversary of the organization of the First Baptist church, Boston, June 7, 1865. Gould and Lincoln, 1865.
 Nathan Eusebius Wood. The history of the First Baptist Church of Boston (1665–1899). American Baptist Publication Society, 1899.

External links

First Baptist Church of Boston Official Website 

Churches completed in 1875
19th-century Baptist churches in the United States
Baptist churches in Boston
Churches on the National Register of Historic Places in Massachusetts
Towers in Massachusetts
Romanesque Revival church buildings in Massachusetts
Religious organizations established in 1665
Henry Hobson Richardson church buildings
Richardsonian Romanesque architecture in Massachusetts
17th-century Baptist churches
North End, Boston
Back Bay, Boston
Stone churches in Massachusetts
1665 establishments in Massachusetts
National Register of Historic Places in Boston
Historic district contributing properties in Massachusetts